Odostomia dealbata is a species of sea snail, a marine gastropod mollusc in the family Pyramidellidae, the pyrams and their allies.

This is a nomen nudum, a naked name that has not been published with an adequate description (or a reference to such a description). Therefore, it cannot be accepted as it currently stands.

Description
The white shell is smooth and pellucid. There are six, rather convex whorls 6 with an inconspicuous fold The length of the shell is 4 mm.

Distribution
This species occurs in the following locations:
 Northwest Atlantic

Notes
Additional information regarding this species:
 Distribution: Range: 42.3°N to 41.3°N; 72°W to 71°W. Distribution: USA: Massachusetts, Connecticut

References

External links
 To Biodiversity Heritage Library (20 publications)
 To Encyclopedia of Life
 To USNM Invertebrate Zoology Mollusca Collection
 To ITIS
 To World Register of Marine Species

dealbata
Gastropods described in 1851